{{DISPLAYTITLE:C19H21N3S}}
The molecular formula C19H21N3S (molar mass: 323.46 g/mol, exact mass: 323.1456 u) may refer to:

 Cyamemazine, or cyamepromazine
 Metiapine